The Northern Light Infantry Regiment (NLI) is a light infantry regiment in the Pakistan Army, based and currently headquartered in Gilgit, Pakistan. Along with other forces of the Pakistani military, the NLI has the primary responsibility of conducting ground operations in the interest of defending the strategically-important territory of Gilgit−Baltistan, a Pakistani-controlled region that constitutes part of Kashmir, which has been disputed between Pakistan and India since 1947. The NLI draws a majority of its recruits from native tribes present in the nearby mountainous areas who are reportedly less prone to altitude sickness and the cold temperatures that characterize high-altitude mountain warfare, allowing the regiment to conduct its duties optimally.

The Northern Light Infantry is best known for the extensive assistance and training it provided to the Afghan mujahideen (with backing from the CIA and ISI) during the Soviet–Afghan War.

Formation
The Northern Light Infantry has its origins in the Gilgit Scouts raised by British India in 1913 for defending the princely state of Jammu and Kashmir's northern frontier. The Scouts, along with rebels in the Jammu and Kashmir State Forces, fought for Pakistan on the northern front of the First Kashmir War, conquering important points of interest such as Skardu, Kargil and Drass (the latter two were subsequently captured by the Indian Army). In 1949, the Gilgit Scouts were split into two forces, with the wing under the original name 'Gilgit Scouts' designated for internal security operations, and a second wing, named the 'Northern Scouts', designated for major external operations. In 1964, the Northern Scouts were further bifurcated with the raising of the 'Karakoram Scouts' based in Skardu. All three forces were brought together again in 1975, under the banner of the Northern Light Infantry (then a paramilitary force). Following the 1999 Kargil War with India, where the Northern Light Infantry saw extensive combat, the force was converted into a regular regiment of the Pakistan Army.

A new paramilitary force was created in 2003 under the name Gilgit−Baltistan Scouts to fill the internal security role of the former Gilgit Scouts.

Status and composition

Upon its founding, the Northern Light Infantry regiment was to function as a paramilitary force, at par with the Pakistan Rangers and Frontier Corps, under the jurisdiction of the Ministry of Interior and commanded by regular Pakistan Army officers. In 1967 and 1970, two battalions of the NLI were airlifted and deployed to Karachi, Sindh, for internal security duties such as riot control and aiding civil authorities during an election-related period of violence. The regiment's performance during this time earned them a commendation from Field Marshal Ayub Khan.

By 1998, the NLI consisted of 20 battalions commanded by a Major-General of the Pakistan Army under the designation of Inspector-General of the NLI, whose office was the Inspectorate-General of NLI reporting to the GOC, X Corps as well as the Pakistani Interior Minister.

Notable operations

Soviet-Afghan War (1979–1989) 
Following the Soviet Union's invasion of Afghanistan in 1979, the United States, United Kingdom, Pakistan and Israel launched Operation Cyclone, in which they financed and armed the Afghan mujahideen to prevent Afghanistan from becoming a Soviet satellite state and subsequently threaten Pakistan (a U.S. ally in the Cold War). Here, with primarily Saudi Arabian and American financing, the Northern Light Infantry trained Afghan mujahideen fighters in Gilgit−Baltistan before sending them back to Afghanistan with state-of-the-art armaments to fight the Soviet military.

Siachen Glacier Conflict (1984–2003)

India's 1984 seizure of the Siachen Glacier (an area of Kashmir that was uninhabited and not controlled by any parties to the Kashmir conflict) resulted renewed high-level tensions with Pakistan until a mutual ceasefire agreement was brought into effect in 2003. During this period of intermittent fighting in the Siachen conflict, the NLI's 1st battalion performed defence and support work.

Kargil War (1999)

In 1984, Pakistan Army was planning to capture the strategic important front of Siachen Glacier. However, India's R&AW detected it in time and subsequently, the Indian Army conducted Operation Meghdoot successfully thereby incurring heavy losses on Pakistan by capturing the Siachen Glacier terrain which proved to be an aggressive step for upcoming days. Pakistan felt humiliated and wanted to revenge and launched several failed operations suffering heavy losses.

Lastly after 15 years, In May 1999 Pakistan began operations to occupy key Indian forward posts along the Line of Control (LoC), sparking the Kargil War. Initially Pakistan Army denied any involvement in the war. However, later on, it was reported that the Pakistan Army had launched forces exclusively from the Northern Light Infantry during this conflict. These included the 5th, 6th, 8th and 12th battalions in full strength and some elements of the 3rd, 4th, 7th and 11th battalions with the paramilitary Chitral and Bajaur Scouts, both of the Frontier Corps, deployed for logistical support.

Massive Indian counterattack coupled with heavy diplomatic pressure from the United States forced Pakistan to begin a withdrawal after months of intense fighting. Pakistani casualties during this conflict, like those of other Indo−Pakistani conflicts, remain disputed and unconfirmed. International sources (such as those from the U.S. Department of Defense) place Pakistani casualties at around 700+. After 11 years, Pakistan officially reported that around 453 of its soldiers were killed during the conflict. PM Nawaz Sharif and some other sources placed the Pakistani casualties figure from 2,700 to 4,000 personnel.

Units
 1st Battalion
 2nd Battalion
 3rd Battalion
 4th Battalion
 5th Battalion
 6th Battalion
 7th Battalion
 8th Battalion
 9th  Battalion
 10th Battalion
 11th Battalion
 12th Battalion
 13th Battalion
 14th Battalion
 15th Battalion
 16th Battalion
 17th Battalion
 18th Battalion

See also
 Kashmir conflict
 Siachen conflict (1984-2003)
 Kargil War
 Soviet-Afghan War
 Operation Cyclone
 Gilgit-Baltistan Scouts
 Ladakh Scouts

References

Further reading

External links
 Northern Light Infantry - Pakistan Army website

Infantry regiments of Pakistan
Mountain units and formations
Military units and formations established in 1999
Military in Gilgit-Baltistan